

Events
January 1 – Giovanni Paisiello officially leaves his employment at the court of Catherine the Great in Russia, having returned to Italy some months earlier.
January 12 – Wolfgang Amadeus Mozart's Die Entführung aus dem Serail is produced by impresario Pasquale Bondini's company in Dresden.
January 15 – The first performance of Wolfgang Amadeus Mozart's six string quartets dedicated to Joseph Haydn (or possibly just three of them) is given in Mozart's own home.
January 21 – Soprano Nancy Storace, who was about to give birth, was replaced as Rosina in a Vienna production of Giovanni Paisiello's Il barbiere di Siviglia by Luisa Laschi, to great acclaim.
February 7 – Leopold Mozart leaves Munich for Vienna, with a pupil, Heinrich Marchand, in tow.
February 26 – Polish violinist Feliks Janiewicz makes what was probably his debut as a soloist in a concert at the Burgtheater in Vienna.
March 7 – King Ferdinand I of Naples awards a lifetime annual salary of 1,200 ducats to Giovanni Paisiello, on the understanding that the latter writes one new opera every year.
March 28 – Domenico Cimarosa becomes second organist at the Chapel Royal of Naples.
 September 19 – Amélie-Julie Candeille makes her Comédie-Française début as a singer.
October 13 – The Lord Chamberlain, James Cecil, Earl of Salisbury, refuses to grant a licence to Giovanni Gallini for his Italian Opera House in London, unless he appoints a Mr. Crawford as deputy manager.
October 26 – Joseph Haydn receives a visit from Venetian revolutionary Francisco de Miranda, to whom he gives a guided tour of Schloss Esterházy.
November 22 – The Hermitage Theatre in St Petersburg, Russia, is officially opened.
Composer John Antes is appointed warder of the Fulneck Moravian Settlement in England
Composer Supply Belcher settles in Maine.
Opera composer  relocates to London from his native Italy.
 Pietro Leopoldo, Grand Duke of Tuscany appoints Filippo Maria Gherardeschi organist and maestro di cappella at the Chiesa Conventuale dei Cavalieri di S Stefano at Pisa.
Violinist Regina Strinasacchi marries Johann Conrad Schlick, cellist & Konzertmeister of the Gotha ducal band.

Bands formed
Band of the Coldstream Guards (16 May)

Published popular music
 "Cara sposa", music by Johann Christian Bach from the cantata Rinaldo ed Armide (lost)
 "Song of the Page", music by William Shield from Follies of a Day, or The Marriage of Figaro
 "Black-eyed Susan", by Robert Broderip

Classical music
Carl Friedrich Abel – 4 Trio Sonatas, WK 98–101 (Op. 16)
Carl Philipp Emanuel Bach – 2 Sonaten, 2 Fantasien und 2 Rondos für Kenner und Liebhaber, Wq.59
Johann Christian Bach
6 Violin Sonatas, Op.10 (posthumously)
2 Symphonies, Op. 18 (posthumously)
Ludwig van Beethoven – Three quartets for harpsichord, violin, viola, and cello, in E major, D major, and C major, WoO 36
William Billings – "I Was Glad When They Said Unto Me, We Will Go Into The House Of Ye Lord"
Luigi Boccherini – Cello Concerto No. 10 in D major, G.483
William Boyce, Ten Voluntaries
Giuseppe Maria Cambini
6 Flute Quartets, T.145–150
6 Trios for Flute, Oboe and Bassoon, Op. 45
Muzio Clementi – Six piano sonatas, Op. 13
Francois Devienne – Flute Concerto No.3 in G major
Carl Ditters von Dittersdorf – Six Symphonies after Ovid's Metamorphoses (comp. 1781, first three published 1785)
Anton Eberl – Symphony in C major
Giuseppe (or Tomasso) Giordani – Caro Mio Ben
Joseph Haydn
Symphony 83 in G minor "La poule"
Symphony 85 in B-flat "La Reine"
Symphony 87 in A major, Hob.I:87
Overture in D major, Hob.Ia:4
12 Minuets, Hob.IX:8
Piano Trios, Op.27 (Hob.XV:2,9,10)
Franz Anton Hoffmeister
Double Bass Concerto No.1 in E-flat major
Keyboard Sonata in A major, WeiH 37
Wolfgang Amadeus Mozart
Piano Concertos 20 in D minor and 21 in C major
String Quartet No.18 in A major, K.464
String Quartet in C, "Dissonance"
Lied zur Gesellenreise, K. 468
Davidde penitente, K. 469
Fantasia in C minor, K. 475
Piano Quartet No. 1, K. 478
Giovanni Paisiello – Il ritorno di Perseo, R.2.6 (cantata)
Ignaz Pleyel
String Quartet
Symphony in D major, B.126
Joseph Bologne de Saint Georges – 6 String Quartets, Op. 14
Johann Schenk – Die Weinlese (singspiel)
John Stanley – "Delusive is the poet's dream"
 – 12 Organ Sonatas, Op. 1
Friedrich Witt – Symphony in A major
Ernst Wilhelm Wolf – 3 String Quartets, Op. 3
Maria Carolina Wolf – Glänzender sinket die Sonne

Opera
 – Giasone e Medea
Marcello Bernardini – Le donne bisbetiche, o sia L'antiquario fanatico, Teatro Pace, Rome (during carnival).
Pierre-Joseph Candeille – Pizarre, ou La conquête de Pérou, Opéra, Paris (3 May)
Luigi Cherubini – La finta principessa, King's Theatre, London (9 April)
Domenico Cimarosa – La donna sempre al suo peggior s'appiglia
Prosper-Didier Deshayes – Le Faux serment
Carl Ditters von Dittersdorf Der Hufschmied (Der gelehrte Hufschmied) (German version, text translated by J. C. Kaffka, of Il maniscalco, 1775), Breslau (13 May)
Robert Jephson – Campaign, or Love in the East Indies, Theatre Royal, Covent Garden, London (12 May)
Thomas Linley
Hurly-Burly, or The Fairy of the Well, Theatre Royal, Drury Lane, London (26 December)
Strangers at Home, Theatre Royal, Drury Lane, London (8 December)

Armida abbandonata, Teatro della Pergola, Florence (autumn)
L'infanta supposta, Teatro Ducale, Modena
Giovanni Paisiello – La grotta di Trofonio, R.1.69
Ignaz Pleyel – Ifigenia in Aulide
Johann Friedrich Reichardt – Artemisia
Antonio Salieri – La Grotta di Trofonio
Giuseppe Sarti – I finti eredi
William Shield
The Nunnery, Covent Garden, London (12 April)
The Choleric Fathers, Covent Garden, London (10 November)
Omai, or A Trip Round the World, Covent Garden, London (20 December)
 Stephen Storace – Gli sposi malcontenti, Burgtheater, Vienna (1 June)

Births
February 2 – Isabella Colbran, coloratura soprano and composer (died 1845)
March 3
, composer (died 1849)
Giovanni Ricordi, violinist and opera publisher (died 1853)
March 6 – Karol Kurpiński, Polish composer (died 1857)
March 19 – Pierre-Joseph-Guillaume Zimmermann, composer (died 1853)
April 4 – Bettina Brentano, composer and writer (died 1859)
April 19 – Alexandre Pierre François Boëly, composer (died 1858)
August 18 – Friedrich Wieck, piano teacher, father of Clara Schumann (died 1873)
September 5 – Thomas Adams, organist and composer (died 1858)
September 11 – Alpheus Babcock, American piano maker (died 1842)
November 2 – Friedrich Kalkbrenner, pianist and composer (died 1849)
 date unknown
 , German-born composer and cellist (died 1867)
 Zofia Dmuszewska, Polish actor and opera singer (died 1807)

Deaths
January 3 – Baldassare Galuppi, composer (born 1706)
April 26 – Karl Siegmund von Seckendorff, composer and noble (born 1744)
May 15 – Karel Blažej Kopřiva, organist and composer (born 1756)
June 2 – Gottfried August Homilius, organist, cantor and composer (born 1714)
June 22 – Matthias Vanden Gheyn, composer (born 1721) 
August 31 – Pietro Chiari, librettist (born 1712)
November 19 – Bernard de Bury, composer (born 1720) 
December 8 – Antonio Maria Mazzoni, composer (born 1717)
December 29 – Johann Heinrich Rolle, composer (born 1716)
date unknown
Giovanni Battista Gervasio, composer and musician (born c. 1725)
Antoine Mahaut, composer and flautist (born 1719)

References

 
18th century in music
Music by year